Afar Al Miftah is a sub-district located in the Al Malagim District, Al Bayda Governorate, Yemen. Afar Al Miftah had a population of 4850 according to the 2004 census.

References 

Sub-districts in Al Malagim District